The 1997–98 Eastern European Hockey League season, was the third season of the multi-national ice hockey league. 10 teams participated in the league, and HK Sokol Kiev of Ukraine won the championship.

First round

Final round

Championship round

5th-8th place

External links
Season on hockeyarchives.info

2
Eastern European Hockey League seasons